Gossens was a municipality in the district of Yverdon of the canton of Vaud in Switzerland. It merged with neighbouring Donneloye on January 1, 2008.

It is situated on the main road between Yverdon and Moudon. Its economy is mostly agricultural.

References

External links

Communal.ch: Profile (in French)

Former municipalities of the canton of Vaud